Mario Fuchs (born 9 August 1976) is a professional snowboarder from Austria. His speciality is the snowboardcross.

Career highlights

Olympic Winter Games
2006 - Torino, 30th at snowboardcross
FIS World Snowboard Championships
2005 - Whistler, 27th at snowboardcross
2007 - Arosa, 6th at snowboardcross
World Cup
2003 - Bad Gastein,  3rd at snowboardcross
2004 - Valle Nevado,  3rd at snowboardcross
2004 - Nassfeld-Hermagor,  3rd at snowboardcross
2006 - Bad Gastein,  1st at snowboardcross
2008 - Bad Gastein,  1st at snowboardcross
2008 - Leysin,  1st at snowboardcross
European Cup
2003 - Berchtesgaden,  1st at snowboardcross
2003 - Krynica,  2nd at snowboardcross
2005 - Bad Gastein,  1st at snowboardcross
South American Cup
2004 - Valle Nevado,  1st at snowboardcross
FIS Races
2007 - Kaunertal,  1st at snowboardcross

External links

1976 births
Living people
Austrian male snowboarders
Snowboarders at the 2006 Winter Olympics
Snowboarders at the 2010 Winter Olympics
Olympic snowboarders of Austria